Oud-Loosdrecht is a village in the province of North Holland, Netherlands. It is a part of the town of Loosdrecht and the municipality of Wijdemeren; it lies about 6 km west of Hilversum.

History
The village was first mentioned in 1384 as "van der Loesdrecht". The current name means "old ferry over the drainage canal". Oud (old) has been added to distinguish from Nieuw-Loosdrecht.

It contains a large amount of Rijksmonumenten.

Gallery

References

Populated places in North Holland
Wijdemeren